The Women's Protection Units or Women's Defense Units is an all-female militia involved in the Syrian civil war. The YPJ is part of the Syrian Democratic Forces, the armed forces of Rojava, and is closely affiliated with the male-led YPG. While the YPJ is mainly made up of Kurds, it also includes women from other ethnic groups in Northern Syria.

History 
Women have been involved in Syrian Kurdish Resistance fighting since as early as 2011, when the mixed-sex YXG was founded, later to be renamed YPG in 2012. The YPJ was founded as a strictly women's organization on 4 April 2013 with the first battalion formed in Jindires and later expanded its activities towards the Kobane and Jazira cantons. All female fighters who were previously part of the YPG mixed units automatically became members of the YPJ. Initially, there was just one YPJ battalion in each of the three cantons of Rojava, but battalions were quickly established in every neighborhood, expanding the organization.

Between 2014 and November 2016 the YPJ counted between 7,000 and 20,000 members. As of August 2017, the group was reported to have 24,000 members. After the defeat of ISIL the number has decreased and according to and interview by its General Commander Newroz Ahmed given to The Guardian, is currently at 5,000.

In the Syrian civil war, the YPJ and the YPG have fought against various groups in northern Syria, including the Islamic State of Iraq and the Levant (ISIL) and was involved in the defense of Kobanî during the Siege of Kobanî beginning in March 2014, with various Kurdish media agencies reporting that "YPJ troops have become vital in the battle". In the Siege of Kobanî, prior to receiving the support of Western powers, the YPJ was forced to hold off ISIL attacks using only "vintage Russian Kalashnikovs bought on the black market, handmade grenades, and tanks they put together out of construction vehicles and pick-up trucks." It was not until October 2014 that the United States began coordinating air strikes with the YPJ-YPG fighters on the ground.

Additionally, the YPG, YPJ and the PKK were involved in an August 2014 military operation at Mount Sinjar, where up to as many as 10,000 Yazidis were rescued from genocide at the hands of ISIL. ISIL had taken control of most areas around Mount Sinjar after pushing out the Peshmerga. Because ISIL views the Yazidis as "a community of devil worshipers," those formerly inhabiting the town of Sinjar were forced to flee into the mountains. This left many Yazidis, including children and the elderly, without food, shelter, or resources. Those still in the town were either massacred by ISIL or forced into sexual slavery.

Along with the help of US air strikes, the attacking force was able to create a  safe zone for the Yazidi refugees to escape ISIL capture. The refugees were then moved into Northern Syria, with most later departing for safer areas of Iraqi Kurdistan.

YPJ continues to fight alongside YPG as part of the multi-ethnic Syrian Democratic Forces (SDF). The YPJ was involved in battles such as the SDF offensive against the major IS strongholds in Tabqa and Raqqa, serving as the main proxy force (along with the YPG) for the United States. During Operation Olive Branch, the Turkish offensive against Afrin Canton, YPJ units were again heavily involved in the fighting. Guerrilla warfare tactics were among the tactics used against Turkey and their Syrian rebel allies.

During the 2019 Turkish offensive into north-eastern Syria, Turkish-backed Free Syrian Army fighters trampled and mutilated the body of what appeared to be a YPJ fighter they killed in the countryside near Kobanî.

Ideology 

The YPJ is politically aligned to the PYD, which bases its philosophy on the writings of Abdullah Öcalan, the leading ideologue in the Kurdistan Workers' Party (PKK), who is imprisoned by Turkey. Central to YPJ ideology is the PYD's ideological concept of "Jineology".

Dating back to the early 1990s, Öcalan had been advocating that a ‘basic responsibility’ of the Kurdish movement was to liberate women. He stated that gender equality and women's liberation is necessary for Kurdish liberation. The PKK established its first all-female units of guerrillas in 1995, stating that in order to “break down gender roles solidified by centuries, women had to be on their own.” The YPJ adheres to the same strand of feminist ideology. Having joined the YPJ, women must spend at least a month practicing military tactics and studying the political theories of Öcalan, including Jineology. In any communal decision, regarding the YPJ/YPG or otherwise, it is required that no less than 40% of women participate.

The group has been praised by feminists for confronting traditional gender expectations and redefining the role of women in conflict in the region. YPJ militants often enter the militia over hardships endured in the family, like lost relatives caused by attacks or fighting. They play a role in changing the Islamic thinking and societal traditions by taking arms. These women say they are changing their community and society by doing so. The YPJ has attracted international attention as an example of significant achievement for women in a region in which women are systematically disadvantaged.

Another all-female force in northern Syria is the Bethnahrain Women's Protection Forces, which was formed as an Assyrian all-female brigade of the Syriac Military Council, seemingly inspired by the example of the YPJ. The Al-Bab Military Council, Kurdish Front and Liwa Thuwar al-Raqqa have also established their own female units.'

Abdullah Öcalan ideas surrounding women rights have been integral to the founding of the Women’s Protection Units (YPJ)  “ the struggle for women's freedom must be waged through the establishment of their own political parties, attaining a popular women's movement, building their own nongovernmental organizations and structures of democratic politics”  Öcalan develops this more in 1996 when he published his theory of separation which asserts that in order to build revolution and advance women's rights, women must organize in units and organizations which are separate from traditional patriarchal structures, "If it is held that revolution cannot be made for the people, but rather by the people, then it must be held that revolution cannot merely be made for women but by women”  as such, the YPJ makes women an integral part of the governmental structure of Rojava as well as giving women an independent military unit which aligns with the theory of separation. As such the YPJ is an example of the manifestation of Kurdish political ideology particularly regarding women's role in nation building.

Foreign volunteers 
On March 16, 2018, Anna Campbell became the first British woman to die while fighting as a part of the YPJ. Campbell had left her home in Lewes, East Sussex to go to Rojava and join the YPJ. She was killed in the city of Afrin during a YPJ confrontation with Turkish military forces. Since her enlistment, a number of other British women, such as Rûken Renas, have also signed up to fight with the YPJ.

Hanna Bohman is another YPJ fighter hailing from the western hemisphere, in her case Canada. After nearly dying in a motorcycle incident, Bohman decided to leave her home in Vancouver, Canada to join the YPJ in February 2014.

Additionally, Arab and Yazidi women that the YPJ liberated from ISIS have also begun fighting against their former oppressors. The YPJ has set up institutions where these women are trained both militarily, as well as in fields such as feminist history and philosophy. The Yazidi population has since created its own self defense force, the Sinjar Resistance Units (YBŞ).

Supply 
The YPJ relies on local communities for supplies and food. The YPJ (along with the YPG) received 27 bundles totaling 24 tons of small arms and ammunition as well as 10 tons of medical supplies from the United States and the Kurdistan Regional Government in Iraqi Kurdistan during the Siege of Kobanî.

Child soldiers
In 2020, the United Nations reported that the YPG/YPJ had the most child soldier recruits of any faction in the Syrian civil war, with 283 child soldiers followed by Tahrir al-Sham with 245 child soldiers. This comes despite a 2014 agreement made with the human rights group Geneva Call promising an end to recruitment of soldiers under the age of 18, since the agreement the YPJ has actually recruited more children into their ranks. Often the YPJ is seen as an opportunity to either escape forced marriage or difficult domestic situations. In the academies they receive education but are not involved in military activities.

Recognition 

 2014, included in the Women of the year by CNN

In popular culture
 The 2022 Kurdish film Kobanê depicts the role of women fighters of the YPJ in the Siege of Kobanî.
 The women fighters of the YPJ are depicted in season six of SEAL Team.

See also
 Kurdish women
 Kurdistan
 Rojava conflict
 Sinjar Resistance Units
 Women in warfare and the military (2000–present)
 Kimmie Taylor
 Anna Campbell

References

Bibliography

External links

Apoist organizations in Syria
All-female military units and formations
Anti-ISIL factions in Syria
Feminism in the Middle East
Kurdish organisations
Military wings of socialist parties
National liberation armies
People's Protection Units
Syrian Democratic Forces
Syrian Kurdish organizations
Women in war
History of women in Syria